This is a list of trains and train museums in the San Francisco Bay Area of Northern California in the United States.

Full-size commuter trains
The Bay Area hosts several regional commuter rail operations, as well as inter-city rail.
Commuter and intercity
 Altamont Corridor Express (ACE)
 Amtrak (California Zephyr, Capitol Corridor, Coast Starlight, and San Joaquins)
 Caltrain
 Sonoma–Marin Area Rail Transit

Rapid transit
 Bay Area Rapid Transit (BART)

Light rail / streetcar
 Santa Clara Valley Transportation Authority light rail (VTA)
 San Francisco Municipal Transportation Agency (SFMTA)
 Muni Heritage streetcars (including the Market Street Railway)
 Muni Metro
 San Francisco cable car system

Full-size excursion trains
The Bay Area is home to several heritage railways that operate full size trains.

 Ardenwood Historic Farm – Fremont
 California Trolley and Railroad Corporation – San Jose
 Napa Valley Wine Train – between Napa and St. Helena
 Niles Canyon Railway – between Fremont and Sunol
 Roaring Camp & Big Trees Narrow Gauge Railroad
 Santa Cruz, Big Trees and Pacific Railway

Ride-on trains
The Bay Area is home to several ridable miniature railways.

East Bay
 Golden Gate Live Steamers – Berkeley
 Kennedy Park Train - Hayward
 Oakland Zoo – Oakland
 Redwood Valley Railway – Berkeley

Peninsula
 Central Park Bianchi Train – San Mateo
 Emerald Hills Railway – Redwood City
 Little Puffer – San Francisco Zoo

North Bay

 Seaside Railway at Six Flags Discovery Kingdom – Vallejo
 Sonoma TrainTown Railroad – Sonoma

South Bay
 Billy Jones Wildcat Railroad – Los Gatos
 Bonfante Railroad Train Ride and Sky Trail Monorail at Gilroy Gardens – Gilroy
 Happy Hollow Park & Zoo – San Jose

Museums
The Bay Area is home to several independent railway museums.

East Bay
 Golden Gate Railroad Museum – Niles Canyon
 Niles Depot Museum – Fremont

North Bay
 Tiburon Depot – Tiburon
 Western Railway Museum – Solano County

Peninsula
 Colma Historical Association – Colma
 Millbrae Train Museum – Millbrae, California
 San Francisco Cable Car Museum – San Francisco
 San Francisco Railway Museum – San Francisco

South Bay
 Los Altos History Museum – Los Altos
 Edward Peterman Museum of Railroad History – Santa Clara

Model trains

There are several clubs in the Bay Area that are home to large layout model trains.

North Bay
 Golden State Model Railroad Museum – Richmond

East Bay
 Alameda County Fairgrounds – Pleasanton
 Black Diamond Lines Model Railroad Club – Antioch
 Diablo Valley Lines – Walnut Creek
 Niles Depot Museum – Fremont
 Walnut Creek Model Railroad Society – Walnut Creek

Peninsula
Barron Park Garden Railway – Palo Alto
 Golden Gate Model Railroad Club – San Francisco
 West Bay Model Railroad Association – Menlo Park

South Bay
 Edward Peterman Museum of Railroad History – Santa Clara
 Silicon Valley Lines – San Jose

See also

List of California railroads

References

External links
 

Tourist attractions in California
Trains
California transportation-related lists
Rail transportation in California